La fiaccola sotto il moggio ("The torch under the bushel") is a 1905 play by the Italian writer Gabriele D'Annunzio. It was adapted for film twice in the silent era.

Film adaptations
 Blood Vengeance (La fiaccola sotto il moggio) (1911), directed by Luigi Maggi
 La fiaccola sotto il moggio (1916), directed by Eleuterio Rodolfi

References

1905 plays
Italian-language literature
Italian plays adapted into films
Plays by Gabriele D'Annunzio